Villarasampatti is a neighbourhood in the city of Erode, Tamil Nadu. It functioned as an independent Village Panchayat until the corporation expansion in 2011. Now officially, it is a part of Erode Municipal Corporation.

Demographics
 India census, Villarasampatti village had a population of 7,438. Males constitute a population 3,721 and females 3,717. Villarasampatti has an average literacy rate of 79.24%, lower than the state average of 80.09%: male literacy is 86.47%, and female literacy is 72.06%. Among the total population of Villarasampatti, 9.61% of the population is under 6 years of age.

References

Neighbourhoods in Erode